Trashigang District (Dzongkha: བཀྲ་ཤིས་སྒང་རྫོང་ཁག་; Wylie: Bkra-shis-sgang rdzong-khag; also spelled "Tashigang") is Bhutan's easternmost dzongkhag (district).

Culture
The population of the district is mainly Sharchop, which means "easterner" in Dzongkha, the national language.

Languages
The dominant language of Trashigang is Tshangla (Sharchopkha), the lingua franca of eastern Bhutan. Two significant minority languages are spoken in the far eastern region of the district: the East Bodish Dakpa language and the Southern Bodish Brokpa language. Dakpa is spoken by descendants of yakherding communities, and may in fact be a divergent dialect of Brokpake, heavily influenced by Dzalakha.

Economy and education
While it has no major urban area, Trashigang has the densest population in Bhutan. It used to be part of an important trade route connecting Assam to Tibet, and still is a primary route for Bhutanese trade with India. Towns include Trashigang (the district capital), Radi, Rangjung, and Phongmey. The district produces rice and lavender.

There are several tourist packages to Bhutan that include trips from Thimphu to Trashigang, despite the 17-hour journey from the capital over the rough and dangerous Lateral Road.

Trashigang is also the site of Sherubtse College, the original college within the Royal University of Bhutan system.

Landmarks

Trashigang Dzong, or fortress, was built in 1659 by the third Druk Desi Chögyal Mingyur Tenpa to defend against Tibetan invaders. Because of its altitude, invading armies remarked that "it is not a dzong on the ground, it is in the sky".

An ancient lhakhang or temple in the district, known for its rock garden, contains a sacred footprint said to be either that of Guru Rimpoche or that of a khandroma (angel).

Rangjung, 16 km east of the district capital, is the site of Rangjung Ösel Chöling Monastery, established by Dungse Garab Dorje Rinpoche in 1989. The temple contains particularly fine images of Padmasambhava, Shantarakshita and Chögyal Trisong Detsen (Khen-Lop-Chö sum).

Administrative divisions
Trashigang Districts is divided into fifteen village blocks (or gewogs):

Bartsham Gewog
Bidung Gewog
Kanglung Gewog
Kangpara Gewog
Khaling Gewog
Lumang Gewog
Merak Gewog
Phongmey Gewog
Radhi Gewog
Sakten Gewog
Samkhar Gewog
Shongphu Gewog
Thrimshing Gewog
Uzorong Gewog
Yangneer Gewog

Protected area
The Sakteng Wildlife Sanctuary, one of ten protected areas of Bhutan, was created in part to protect the migoi, a type of yeti in whose existence most Bhutanese believe. The sanctuary covers the eastern third of the district (the gewogs of Merag and Sakteng), and is connected via biological corridor to Khaling Wildlife Sanctuary in Samdrup Jongkhar District to the south.

See also
Districts of Bhutan
Kurmaed Province
Merak
Ngalangkang

References

External links
 Trashigang Dzongkhag website 
Trashigang Five Year Plan 
Trashigang Dzong photo gallery

 
Districts of Bhutan